Escape from Hell is a 2000 Christian horror thriller film.

Plot
The film is about young Dr. Eric Robinson (played by Daniel Kruse), who becomes obsessed with the idea of an afterlife that leads all people to heaven. Through a series of events that leads to his own death, he finds out that hell is a very real place for those who have rejected the grace and love of Jesus Christ.

Cast

Reception
Ken James of Christian Spotlight on Entertainment gave the film 2/5 stars saying, "...many moviegoers today are used to big budget Hollywood-style eye candy and so may be unable to get over the lesser effects 'Escape...' brings. The acting is substandard in some areas as well, and the quality of the video feels more like a daytime television show than a blockbuster film. Yet we must remember that it is the gospel being preached here, and the Bible promises that..." Televangelist, Jack Van Impe, called the film, "...a great movie, a thriller, and masterfully produced..." Jerry Falwell (the 1st President of Liberty University) gave the film 4/5 stars and stated, "...If this doesn’t get a non-believer to think about life without Christ, nothing will..."

References

External links

2000 films
2000 horror films
2000 drama films
American drama films
Films about Christianity
Films about evangelicalism
Films about religion
2000s English-language films
2000s American films